Swedish driving licences adhere to a standard set in the European Economic Area. 18 years is the minimum age to obtain a licence for cars (lower for some vehicles).

Practical training
The amount of practical training required varies depending on how well the student can already operate the vehicle. There's no lower limit, or requirement to document what road conditions the student trained in. In fact there's no documentation required on how much he or she has trained at all, privately or at a driver's school.

The so called in Swedish "risk" education is however compulsory to obtaining a licence for a passenger car (B) or a motorcycle (A1, A2, A). This education is technically the only compulsory part after the student obtaining a learners permit, before he or she gets to take the final 2 tests. The "risk" education consists of two parts:
 Part 1 (hazard education). This learning exercise shows consciences with drink and driving, driving and texting, and many more (uses both real and imagery events as examples). Although this part is more theoretical.
 Part 2 (hazard education). This tests and educates how the student maneuvers his or her vehicle in the winter if it's slippery, and also performs effective braking tests.

Theoretical training
The theoretical test in Sweden consists of eight parts.

 Phase A, B and C (traffic and risks)
 Phase Vehicle (how to maintain a vehicle)
 Phase Repeat (repetition of prior steps but with additional questions)
 Phase Final test (recreating a final test from "Vägverket")

The student needs to take the "Risk 1", theoretical training about drugs, alcohol and driving.

All these are completed on a computer with an exception for the Risk 1 which they will work together in a group while listening to an instructor.

Driver licence
AM Driver licence = 50cc for age 15 year old and up. The AM-licence also allows the driver to drive a class 1 moped (with a top speed of 45 km/h), an A-Traktor (a specially reconstructed car that has been registered as a tractor with a maximum speed of 30 km/h), or a Motorised quadricycle.
A1 Driver licence = 16 years of age (includes motorcycle 125cc with a maximum power output of 11 kW, and a maximum power/weight of 0.1 kW per kilo) AM / class 2 vehicles Tractor is also included in A1.
A2 Driver license = 18 years of age (includes a  motorcycle with a maximum power output, of 35 kW, and a maximum power/weight ratio of 0.2 kW per kilo)
A Driver license = 20 years of age (if the driver has had A2 license for two years or more, otherwise 24 years of age) allows one to ride any motorcycle regardless of power output
B (car) = 18 years of age (includes car licence for a vehicle that weighs up to 3.5 tonnes and also AM licence, light truck, light trailer, tractor, three and four wheeled motorcycles, off-road military vehicles that weigh up to 2 tonnes, snowmobile (if the driver got their licence before 2000; otherwise the driver needs an off-road licence)
BE (car with heavy trailer) = The driver may use a heavy trailer for his or her car. There is no limit concerning the number of trailers, although restricted by the maximum length of an equipage. Licenses issued before 2013 have no weight limit on the trailers licenses issued since 2013 are limited to 3.5 tonnes total trailer weight. Even if licenses have no weight limit, the towing vehicles and the trailers have such limits, which can be up to 3.5 tonnes for some cars.
C1 (heavy car/trucks) = a car or truck that may weigh above 3.5 tonnes and under 7.5 tonnes.
C1E (heavy car/trucks) = a car or truck that may weigh above 3.5 tonnes and under 7.5 tonnes with weight limited trailer(s) to 12 tonnes.
C (heavy car/trucks) = a car or truck that may weigh above 3.5 tonnes*
CE (heavy car/truck) = a car or truck with 3.5 tonnes of weight or more with an unlimited weight trailer*
D1 (bus) a bus constructed for maximum of 16 passengers in addition to the driver and is not longer the 8 metres*
D1E (bus) buses included in category D1 and one or more trailers, regardless of weight, attached to such a bus*
D (bus) = bus licence which requires the driver to be at least 21 years of age*
DE (bus) = bus licence with unlimited trailer weight*

*Required age for the driver can lower if the driver obtained basic skills from basic training as defined in the Swedish Act on Professional Driving Competence.

Instruction
A learner's permit can be issued from age sixteen. The student may choose to learn by going to a driving school or in private with up to four different instructors. Usually a combination of the two is used. These instructors must be 24 or older and must have held a valid driver's licence for five years (it must not have been cancelled temporarily for drink driving and other serious traffic violations, but a single speeding conviction is now acceptable). The instructors and student must go through a traffic safety course before permission is granted; it takes about three hours to complete and is usually given at all driving schools on certain dates. From 2010 it is enough for every student and every instructor to go on this course once; before that each instructor and student pair had to go together, e.g. father/elder child, mother/elder child, father/younger child, mother/younger child.

Testing
When learners reach age 18 they may take a theory test; a score of 52 out of 65 questions is required to pass. They must also attend a hazard lesson, which may, for instance, take place at a track which is sprayed with oil to make it slippery. First, students learn about the human factor and other dangers in traffic; then they drive the course and try to make the car spin so they can learn to control it during such situations.

Students then take a driving test. If they pass, a driver's licence is granted; it usually comes by mail a few days later. Until then newly licensed drivers are given a temporary licence (valid for a year). The licences are issued by the Swedish Transport Agency. For both tests a fully valid identity document is needed.

Driving test for class A (motorcycle)
The student must show ability to hold the weight of the motorcycle by walking with it. Then the student must do a driving test in very slow speed, in order to show balance. After that there is a test to maneuver away from obstacles at 50 km/h, and then a brake test at 70 km/h and 90 km/h.

If the student has passed these tests, a driving test in the city is performed, and then on a highway. The student must be able to handle traffic, know the traffic rules and be able to handle the acceleration of the motorcycle.

Driving test for class B (car)
The student must show knowledge of how to do a standard check of the vehicle, like checking the brakes, brake fluid, and lights.

Then there is the driving test. When it comes to B licence, the student goes through three steps, city road (for example driving in a soft manner), highway (making sure the student accelerates fast, yet driving safely for the environment and traffic safety), housing estate (making sure the student is observant of people and pets that may move through these areas). The student must be able to handle traffic and know the traffic rules.

Driving test for class C and D (heavy vehicles)
The theoretical test covers similar things as the car test, but also things like brakes and driving time rules.

The driver test aims partly to test ability to maneuver a large vehicle.

In order to be allowed to drive professionally (against salary) a special skill certificate is needed. A special education is needed to get it, which covers things like the driving time rules, the tachograph, load securing, and passenger safety (buses). This education is around six weeks long.

Probation
The first two first years are considered a probationary period. If, during that time, the driver commits any traffic offense which results in a suspended license, the driver is required to redo all required tests rather than having the license returned to them without action after a set period of time.

Replacing a foreign driving licence
It is mandatory to have either a Swedish or EU/EEA driving licence to drive in Sweden if one has been a resident in the country for more than one year.

A person holding a driving licence from certain countries may exchange it for a Swedish licence without the need for a test. These countries are the EU/EEA nations, Switzerland and Japan. People holding a driving licence from other countries must do the full test in order to obtain a Swedish driving licence.

Holders of an EU driving licence in Sweden must pay an additional "inspection fee", on top of the standard fee for the issuing of the licence, to have their licence converted to a Swedish licence. This differs from many other European countries, where authorities charge national licence holders and EU licence holders the same fee to have a new licence issued, seeing as all EU licences are equally valid and follow a standard format.

Identity document
A Swedish driving licence is valid as an identity document in Sweden. A person having a driving licence don't need a separate id card. There is not any law saying which identity document is valid for what purpose in Sweden, instead this is decided by organisations who need to identify people. Banks have been leading this and other organisations followed.

An investigation has been made in 2019 by the Swedish government about identity documents, suggesting stopping allowing driving licence as identity documents, due to lower technical security (forgeries are common) and because the driver don't need to visit any office, but can send an own photo by mail and get the license by mail. As of 2022 driving licences are still usable as identity document.

See also
 European driving licence

References

Sweden
Transport in Sweden
Driving in Sweden